Poa chaixii, known as broad-leaved meadow-grass or broadleaf bluegrass, is a species of perennial grass native to Europe and temperate Asia.

References
Notes

Sources
J. E. Gilibert, Fl. Delph. 1:7. 1788

External links

chaixii
Flora of Europe